Germanium dioxide, also called germanium(IV) oxide, germania, and salt of germanium, is an inorganic compound with the chemical formula GeO2.  It is the main commercial source of germanium. It also forms as a passivation layer on pure germanium in contact with atmospheric oxygen.

Structure
The two predominant polymorphs of GeO2 are hexagonal and tetragonal. Hexagonal GeO2 has the same structure as β-quartz, with germanium having coordination number 4. Tetragonal GeO2 (the mineral argutite) has the rutile-like structure seen in stishovite. In this motif, germanium has the coordination number 6. An amorphous (glassy) form of GeO2 is similar to fused silica.

Germanium dioxide can be prepared in both crystalline and amorphous forms. At ambient pressure the amorphous structure is formed by a network of GeO4 tetrahedra. At elevated pressure up to approximately 9 GPa the germanium average coordination number steadily increases from 4 to around 5 with a corresponding increase in the Ge–O bond distance. At higher pressures, up to approximately 15 GPa, the germanium coordination number increases to 6, and the dense network structure is composed of GeO6 octahedra. When the pressure is subsequently reduced, the structure reverts to the tetrahedral form. At high pressure, the rutile form converts to an orthorhombic CaCl2 form.

Reactions
Heating germanium dioxide with powdered germanium at 1000 °C forms germanium monoxide (GeO).

The hexagonal (d = 4.29 g/cm3) form of germanium dioxide is more soluble than the rutile (d = 6.27 g/cm3) form and dissolves to form  acid, H4GeO4, or Ge(OH)4. GeO2 is only slightly soluble in acid but dissolves more readily in alkali to give germanates. The germanic acid forms stable complexes with di- and polyfunctional carboxylic acids, poly-alcohols, and o-diphenols. 

In contact with hydrochloric acid, it releases the volatile and corrosive germanium tetrachloride.

Uses
The refractive index (1.7) and optical dispersion properties of germanium dioxide make it useful as an optical material for wide-angle lenses, in optical microscope objective lenses, and for the core of fiber-optic lines. See Optical fiber for specifics on the manufacturing process. Both germanium and its glass oxide, GeO2, are transparent to the infrared (IR) spectrum. The glass can be manufactured into IR windows and lenses, used for night-vision technology in the military, luxury vehicles, and thermographic cameras. GeO2 is preferred over other IR transparent glasses because it is mechanically strong and therefore preferred for rugged military usage.

A mixture of silicon dioxide and germanium dioxide ("silica-germania") is used as an optical material for optical fibers and optical waveguides. Controlling the ratio of the elements allows precise control of refractive index. Silica-germania glasses have lower viscosity and higher refractive index than pure silica. Germania replaced titania as the silica dopant for silica fiber, eliminating the need for subsequent heat treatment, which made the fibers brittle.

Germanium dioxide is also used as a catalyst in production of polyethylene terephthalate resin, and for production of other germanium compounds. It is used as a feedstock for production of some phosphors and semiconductor materials.

Germanium dioxide is used in algaculture as an inhibitor of unwanted diatom growth in algal cultures, since contamination with the comparatively fast-growing diatoms often inhibits the growth of or outcompetes the original algae strains. GeO2 is readily taken up by diatoms and leads to silicon being substituted by germanium in biochemical processes within the diatoms, causing a significant reduction of the diatoms' growth rate or even their complete elimination, with little effect on non-diatom algal species. For this application, the concentration of germanium dioxide typically used in the culture medium is between 1 and 10 mg/L, depending on the stage of the contamination and the species.

Toxicity and medical
Germanium dioxide has low toxicity, but it is nephrotoxic in higher doses.

Germanium dioxide is used as a germanium supplement in some questionable dietary supplements and "miracle cures". High doses of these resulted in several cases of germanium poisonings.

References

Germanium(IV) compounds
Oxides
Optical materials
Ceramic materials
Glass compositions
Transparent materials